Anthony Lakes may refer to:

 Anthony Lakes (Oregon), a group of about 15 lakes and marshes in northeastern Oregon
 Anthony Lakes (ski area), in eastern Oregon